Osteomyelitis (OM) is an infection of bone. Symptoms may include pain in a specific bone with overlying redness, fever, and weakness. The long bones of the arms and legs are most commonly involved in children e.g. the femur and humerus, while the feet, spine, and hips are most commonly involved in adults.

The cause is usually a bacterial infection, but rarely can be a fungal infection. It may occur by spread from the blood or from surrounding tissue. Risks for developing osteomyelitis include diabetes, intravenous drug use, prior removal of the spleen, and trauma to the area. Diagnosis is typically suspected based on symptoms and basic laboratory tests as C-reactive protein (CRP) and erythrocyte sedimentation rate (ESR).This is because plain radiographs are unremarkable in the first few days following acute infection. Diagnosis is further confirmed by blood tests, medical imaging, or bone biopsy.

Treatment of bacterial osteomyelitis often involves both antimicrobials and surgery. In people with poor blood flow, amputation may be required. Treatment of the relatively rare fungal osteomyelitis as mycetoma infections entails the use of antifungal medications. In contrast to bacterial osteomyelitis, amputation or large bony resections is more common in neglected fungal osteomyelitis, namely mycetoma, where infections of the foot account for the majority of cases. Treatment outcomes of bacterial osteomyelitis are generally good when the condition has only been present a short time. About 2.4 per 100,000 people are affected each year. The young and old are more commonly affected. Males are more commonly affected than females. The condition was described at least as early as the 300s BC by Hippocrates. Prior to the availability of antibiotics, the risk of death was significant.

Signs and symptoms
Symptoms may include pain in a specific bone with overlying redness, fever, and weakness and inability to walk especially in children with acute bacterial osteomyelitis. Onset may be sudden or gradual. Enlarged lymph nodes may be present.
In fungal osteomyelitis, there is usually a history of walking bare-footed, especially in rural and farming areas. Contrary to the mode of infection in bacterial osteomyelitis, which is primarily blood-borne, fungal osteomyelitis starts as a skin infection, then invades deeper tissues until it reaches bone.

Cause

In children, the metaphyses, the ends of long bones, are usually affected. In adults, the vertebrae and the pelvis are most commonly affected. 

Acute osteomyelitis almost invariably occurs in children who are otherwise healthy, because of rich blood supply to the growing bones. When adults are affected, it may be because of compromised host resistance due to debilitation, intravenous drug abuse, infectious root-canaled teeth, or other disease or drugs (e.g., immunosuppressive therapy). 

Osteomyelitis is a secondary complication in 1–3% of patients with pulmonary tuberculosis. In this case, the bacteria, in general, spread to the bone through the circulatory system, first infecting the synovium (due to its higher oxygen concentration) before spreading to the adjacent bone. In tubercular osteomyelitis, the long bones and vertebrae are the ones that tend to be affected.

Staphylococcus aureus is the organism most commonly isolated from all forms of osteomyelitis.

Bloodstream-sourced osteomyelitis is seen most frequently in children, and nearly 90% of cases are caused by Staphylococcus aureus. In infants, S. aureus, Group B streptococci (most common) and Escherichia coli are commonly isolated; in children from one to 16 years of age, S. aureus, Streptococcus pyogenes, and Haemophilus influenzae are common. In some subpopulations, including intravenous drug users and splenectomized patients, Gram-negative bacteria, including enteric bacteria, are significant pathogens.

The most common form of the disease in adults is caused by injury exposing the bone to local infection. Staphylococcus aureus is the most common organism seen in osteomyelitis, seeded from areas of contiguous infection. But anaerobes and Gram-negative organisms, including Pseudomonas aeruginosa, E. coli, and Serratia marcescens, are also common. Mixed infections are the rule rather than the exception.

Systemic mycotic infections may also cause osteomyelitis. The two most common are Blastomyces dermatitidis and Coccidioides immitis.

In osteomyelitis involving the vertebral bodies, about half the cases are due to S. aureus, and the other half are due to tuberculosis (spread hematogenously from the lungs). Tubercular osteomyelitis of the spine was so common before the initiation of effective antitubercular therapy, it acquired a special name, Pott's disease.

The Burkholderia cepacia complex has been implicated in vertebral osteomyelitis in intravenous drug users.

Pathogenesis
In general, microorganisms may infect bone through one or more of three basic methods
 Via the bloodstream (haematogeneously) – the most common method
 From nearby areas of infection (as in cellulitis), or
 Penetrating trauma, including iatrogenic causes such as joint replacements or internal fixation of fractures, leading to a fracture-related infection, or secondary periapical periodontitis in teeth.
The area usually affected when the infection is contracted through the bloodstream is the metaphysis of the bone. Once the bone is infected, leukocytes enter the infected area, and, in their attempt to engulf the infectious organisms, release enzymes that lyse the bone. Pus spreads into the bone's blood vessels, impairing their flow, and areas of devitalized infected bone, known as sequestra, form the basis of a chronic infection. Often, the body will try to create new bone around the area of necrosis. The resulting new bone is often called an involucrum. On histologic examination, these areas of necrotic bone are the basis for distinguishing between acute osteomyelitis and chronic osteomyelitis. Osteomyelitis is an infective process that encompasses all of the bone (osseous) components, including the bone marrow. When it is chronic, it can lead to bone sclerosis and deformity.

Chronic osteomyelitis may be due to the presence of intracellular bacteria. Once intracellular, the bacteria are able to spread to adjacent bone cells. At this point, the bacteria may be resistant to certain antibiotics. These combined factors may explain the chronicity and difficult eradication of this disease, resulting in significant costs and disability, potentially leading to amputation. The presence of intracellular bacteria in chronic osteomyelitis is likely an unrecognized contributing factor in its persistence.

In infants, the infection can spread to a joint and cause arthritis. In children, large subperiosteal abscesses can form because the periosteum is loosely attached to the surface of the bone.

Because of the particulars of their blood supply, the tibia, femur, humerus, vertebrae, maxilla and the mandibular bodies are especially susceptible to osteomyelitis. Abscesses of any bone, however, may be precipitated by trauma to the affected area. Many infections are caused by Staphylococcus aureus, a member of the normal flora found on the skin and mucous membranes. In patients with sickle cell disease, the most common causative agent is Salmonella, with a relative incidence more than twice that of S. aureus.

Diagnosis
  

The diagnosis of osteomyelitis is complex and relies on a combination of clinical suspicion and indirect laboratory markers such as a high white blood cell count and fever, although confirmation of clinical and laboratory suspicion with imaging is usually necessary.

Radiographs and CT are the initial method of diagnosis, but are not sensitive and only moderately specific for the diagnosis. They can show the cortical destruction of advanced osteomyelitis, but can miss nascent or indolent diagnoses.

Confirmation is most often by MRI. The presence of edema, diagnosed as increased signal on T2 sequences, is sensitive, but not specific, as edema can occur in reaction to adjacent cellulitis. Confirmation of bony marrow and cortical destruction by viewing the T1 sequences significantly increases specificity. The administration of intravenous gadolinium-based contrast enhances specificity further. In certain situations, such as severe Charcot arthropathy, diagnosis with MRI is still difficult. Similarly, it is limited in distinguishing avascular necrosis from osteomyelitis in sickle cell anemia.

Nuclear medicine scans can be a helpful adjunct to MRI in patients who have metallic hardware that limits or prevents effective magnetic resonance. Generally a triple phase technetium 99 based scan will show increased uptake on all three phases. Gallium scans are 100% sensitive for osteomyelitis but not specific, and may be helpful in patients with metallic prostheses. Combined WBC imaging with marrow studies has 90% accuracy in diagnosing osteomyelitis.

Diagnosis of osteomyelitis is often based on radiologic results showing a lytic center with a ring of sclerosis. Culture of material taken from a bone biopsy is needed to identify the specific pathogen; alternative sampling methods such as needle puncture or surface swabs are easier to perform, but cannot be trusted to produce reliable results.

Factors that may commonly complicate osteomyelitis are fractures of the bone, amyloidosis, endocarditis, or sepsis.

Classification
The definition of OM is broad, and encompasses a wide variety of conditions. Traditionally, the length of time the infection has been present and whether there is suppuration (pus formation) or osteosclerosis (pathological increased density of bone) are used to arbitrarily classify OM. Chronic OM is often defined as OM that has been present for more than one month. In reality, there are no distinct subtypes; instead, there is a spectrum of pathologic features that reflects a balance between the type and severity of the cause of the inflammation, the immune system and local and systemic predisposing factors.
 Suppurative osteomyelitis
 Acute suppurative osteomyelitis
 Chronic suppurative osteomyelitis
 Primary (no preceding phase)
 Secondary (follows an acute phase)
 Non-suppurative osteomyelitis
 Diffuse sclerosing
 Focal sclerosing (condensing osteitis)
 Proliferative periostitis (periostitis ossificans, Garré's sclerosing osteomyelitis)
 Osteoradionecrosis

OM can also be typed according to the area of the skeleton in which it is present. For example, osteomyelitis of the jaws is different in several respects from osteomyelitis present in a long bone. Vertebral osteomyelitis is another possible presentation.

Treatment
Osteomyelitis often requires prolonged antibiotic therapy for weeks or months. A PICC line or central venous catheter can be placed for long-term intravenous medication administration. Some studies of children with acute osteomyelitis report that antibiotic by mouth may be justified due to PICC-related complications. It may require surgical debridement in severe cases, or even amputation. Antibiotics by mouth and by intravenous appear similar.

Due to insufficient evidence it is unclear what the best antibiotic treatment is for osteomyelitis in people with sickle cell disease as of 2019.

Initial first-line antibiotic choice is determined by the patient's history and regional differences in common infective organisms. A treatment lasting 42 days is practiced in a number of facilities. Local and sustained availability of drugs have proven to be more effective in achieving prophylactic and therapeutic outcomes. Open surgery is needed for chronic osteomyelitis, whereby the involucrum is opened and the sequestrum is removed or sometimes saucerization can be done. Hyperbaric oxygen therapy has been shown to be a useful adjunct to the treatment of refractory osteomyelitis.

Before the widespread availability and use of antibiotics, blow fly larvae were sometimes deliberately introduced to the wounds to feed on the infected material, effectively scouring them clean.

There is tentative evidence that bioactive glass may also be useful in long bone infections. Support from randomized controlled trials, however, was not available as of 2015.

Hemicorporectomy is performed in severe cases of Terminal Osteomyelitis in the Pelvis if further treatment won’t stop the infection.

History
The word is from Greek words ὀστέον osteon, meaning bone, μυελός myelos meaning marrow, and -ῖτις -itis meaning inflammation. 

In 1875, American artist Thomas Eakins depicted a surgical procedure for osteomyelitis at Jefferson Medical College, in an oil painting titled The Gross Clinic.

Canadian politician and premier of Saskatchewan Tommy Douglas suffered from osteomyelitis as a child, and in 1910, underwent several surgeries, which the surgeon performed for free in exchange for allowing his medical students to observe the procedures (which Douglas's parents could not have otherwise afforded). This experience convinced him that  medical care should be free for everyone. Douglas became known as the Canadian "Father of  Medicare."

Fossil record

Evidence for osteomyelitis found in the fossil record is studied by paleopathologists, specialists in ancient disease and injury. It has been reported in fossils of the large carnivorous dinosaur Allosaurus fragilis. Osteomyelitis has been also associated with the first evidence of parasites in dinosaur bones.

See also

 Brodie abscess
 Chronic recurrent multifocal osteomyelitis
 SAPHO syndrome
 Garre's sclerosing osteomyelitis

References

External links 

 
 

Bacterial diseases
Osteopathies
Wikipedia medicine articles ready to translate
Wikipedia emergency medicine articles ready to translate